Hartvig Møller (27 March 1924 – 19 February 2005) was a Danish footballer. He played in one match for the Denmark national football team in 1949.

References

External links
 

1924 births
2005 deaths
Danish men's footballers
Denmark international footballers
Place of birth missing
Association footballers not categorized by position